Hockey Club Kryzhynka-Kompanion is an ice hockey team in Kyiv, Ukraine. They play in the Ukrainian Hockey League, the top level of ice hockey in Ukraine.

History
The club was founded as HK Kyiv in 2000, and changed their name to HK Kompanion Kyiv in 2006.

The team was backed financially by Naftogaz and Yuriy Boyko between the years 2010–2015, playing these years under the name Hockey Club Kompanion-Naftohaz.

Honours
 Ukrainian Hockey Championship Regular Season
  Winners (1): 2013-14
 Ukrainian Hockey Championship
  Winners (1): 2014

References 

Ice hockey teams in Ukraine
Professional Hockey League teams
Sport in Kyiv
Ice hockey clubs established in 2000
2000 establishments in Ukraine
Naftogaz